Michael James Joseph Coffey (born 29 September 1958) is an English former professional footballer who played in the Football League for Mansfield Town.

References

1958 births
Living people
English footballers
Association football midfielders
English Football League players
Everton F.C. players
Mansfield Town F.C. players
Bangor City F.C. players
Stafford Rangers F.C. players
Nuneaton Borough F.C. players